Akoboissué (also spelled Akabovvosué) is a town in eastern Ivory Coast. It is a sub-prefecture of Agnibilékrou Department in Indénié-Djuablin Region, Comoé District. Ten kilometres east of town is a border crossing with Ghana.

Akoboissué was a commune until March 2012, when it became one of 1126 communes nationwide that were abolished.
In 2014, the population of the sub-prefecture of Akoboissué was 28,647.

Villages
The seven villages of the sub-prefecture of Akoboissué and their population in 2014 are:
 Akoboissué  (6 206)
 Brindoukro  (2 598)
 Emanzoukro  (1 106)
 Manzanouan  (10 202)
 N'djorekro Agni  (1 424)
 Siakakro  (5 837)
 Sinikosson  (1 274)

References

Sub-prefectures of Indénié-Djuablin
Former communes of Ivory Coast